Ustad Gul Mohammad Khan (1876–1979) was a Bangladeshi musician. He was awarded Ekushey Padak in 1977 by the Government of Bangladesh.

Background
Khan's father, Ustad Ahmad Khan, was a singer in the court of the Maharaja. His grandfather, Ustad Namder Khan, was also a musician.

Career
Khan was skilled in Dhrupad and Kheyal. He performed at the inauguration ceremony of the Dhaka Radio Centre. Later he joined the institute as a music teacher.

Awards and honors
 Bulbul Academy Award (1965)
 Pride of Performance Award (1971) by the President of Pakistan
 Ekushey Padak (1977)

The Shilpakala Academy held a reception in Khan's honor in 1977.

References

Bangladeshi male musicians
1876 births
1979 deaths
Recipients of the Ekushey Padak
Recipients of the Pride of Performance
Musicians from Bihar
People from Darbhanga district